Kostas Papachristos (1916 – 29 September 1995) was a Greek actor who was known for his comedic acting roles.

Biography

He was born in Volos in 1916 and died in Athens in 1995.  He was the husband of Dimitra Seremeti (b. 1933) and brother of the actor Nikos Papachristos.  He played mostly military, police and other roles. His marriage was childless.

Filmography

References

External links

1916 births
1995 deaths
Greek male actors
People from Volos
20th-century Greek male actors